Battle dress, field uniform, or combat uniform, is a type of uniform worn in the field/combat.

Battle dress may also refer to:

British Battledress, the combat uniform worn by the British Army from the late 1930s until the 1960s
Battle Dress Uniform, the combat uniform worn by the United States Armed Forces from the early 1980s to the mid-2000s